This is a list of singles that have peaked in the top 10 of the French Singles Chart in 2022.

Top 10 singles

Key

Entries by artists

The following table shows artists who achieved two or more top 10 entries in 2022. The figures include both main artists and featured artists and the peak position in brackets.

See also
2022 in music
List of number-one hits of 2022 (France)

References

Top
France top 10
Top 10 singles in 2022
France 2022